Mart Laar's second cabinet was in office in Estonia from 25 March 1999 to 28 January 2002, when it was succeeded by Siim Kallas' cabinet.

Members

This cabinet's members were the following:
 Mart Laar – Prime Minister
 Jüri Mõis – Minister of Interior Affairs
 Toomas Hendrik Ilves – Minister of Foreign Affairs
 Märt Rask – Minister of Justice
 Mihkel Pärnoja – Minister of Economic Affairs

References

Cabinets of Estonia